For the Eurovision Song Contest 1998, Malta entered "The One That I Love", performed by Chiara.

Before Eurovision

National final 
The final was held on 6 and 7 February 1998 at the Mediterranean Conference Centre in Valletta, hosted by Angela Agius, John Demanuele, Denise Mintoff and Patrick Vella. On the first night, 22 songs were presented, 6 of which were in a special category for newcomers to the contest. Those 6 were reduced to 4 after the first night, so that on the second night there were 20 songs. The 2 songs that were eliminated after the first night were "Come Back Home" performed by Rita Pace and "That Magic In Your Eyes" performed by Tonio Cuschieri. On the second night, all 20 finalists performed, and the winner was chosen by an "expert" jury.

At Eurovision
The song received 165 points, finishing 3rd. This was Malta's best result along with 1992 up to that point before their second place in 2002 and 2005.

Voting

References

1998
Countries in the Eurovision Song Contest 1998
Eurovision